Sounds of Africa is the fourth album by double bassist and oud player Ahmed Abdul-Malik featuring performances recorded in 1962 (with one track from 1961) and originally released on the New Jazz label.

Reception

Rob Ferrier of Allmusic says, "Soaked with sounds that wouldn't become fashionable in jazz for nearly another decade, this is a very interesting statement by an overlooked musician... For those looking for something new, or perhaps in search of a missing musical link, this disc will reward repeated listens".

Track listing
All compositions by Ahmed Abdul-Malik except as indicated
 "Wakida Hena" - 3:53    
 "African Bossa Nova" - 6:00    
 "Nadusilma" - 4:00    
 "Out of Nowhere" (Johnny Green, Edward Heyman) - 5:00    
 "Communication" - 9:46    
 "Suffering" - 5:13  
Recorded at Van Gelder Studio on May 23, 1961 (track 4) and August 22, 1962 (tracks 1-3, 5 & 6)

Personnel
Ahmed Abdul-Malik - bass, oud
Tommy Turrentine (track 4), Richard Williams (tracks 1-3, 5 & 6) - trumpet 
Rupert Alleyne - flute (tracks 1-3, 5 & 6)
Bilal Abdurrahman - clarinet, percussion
Edwin Steede - alto saxophone (tracks 1-3, 5 & 6) 
Taft Chandler (tracks 1-3, 5 & 6), Eric Dixon (track 4) - tenor saxophone
Calo Scott - cello, violin
Rudy Collins  (tracks 1-3, 5 & 6), Andrew Cyrille (track 4) - drums
Chief Bey - African drums (tracks 1-3, 5 & 6)
Montego Joe - congas, bongos (tracks 1-3, 5 & 6)

References

Prestige Records albums
Ahmed Abdul-Malik albums
1962 albums
Albums recorded at Van Gelder Studio
Albums produced by Esmond Edwards